Uno Laur (born 8 June 1961 in Rakvere), also known as Kohtla-Järve Uno (a nickname derived from his hometown Kohtla-Järve), is an Estonian-Jewish anarchist and the iconoclastic ex lead singer of the Must Mamba and Röövel Ööbik, "the oldest punk in Estonia".

References

External links
"The first band included Kuldar Poska, Allan Hmelnitski and Uno Laur."
"Lahkuvad Uno Laur ja Kuldar Poska." 
Röövel Ööbik

1961 births
Living people
Anarcho-punk
Estonian anarchists
20th-century Estonian male singers
Estonian rock singers
Jewish anarchists
People from Rakvere
Punk rock musicians